Sirimongkhon Jitbanjong (born August 8, 1997) is a Thai professional footballer who plays as a winger or an attacking midfielder for Thai League 3 club Navy.

International career
He also represents for Thailand U-19 national football team in 2016 AFC U-19 Championship qualification.

External links

1997 births
Living people
Sirimongkhon Jitbanjong
Sirimongkhon Jitbanjong
Association football forwards
Sirimongkhon Jitbanjong
Sirimongkhon Jitbanjong
Sirimongkhon Jitbanjong
Sirimongkhon Jitbanjong